This is a list of the most important fjords of the Russian Federation.

Fjords
In spite of the vastness of the Arctic coastlines of the Russian Federation there are relatively few fjords in Russia. Fjords are circumscribed to certain areas only; over thirty are in Novaya Zemlya —including lakes which are structurally fjords, with a few others in the Barents Sea coast of the Kola Peninsula, the Severnaya Zemlya  archipelago, the Bering Sea coast of the Chukchi Peninsula and the southeastern shores of Kamchatka.

 Akhmatov Fjord, Bolshevik Island, Severnaya Zemlya
 Ara Bay, Kola Peninsula
 Arkhangelskaya Bay, Novaya Zemlya
 Bezymyannaya Fjord, Novaya Zemlya
 Blafyel Bay, Novaya Zemlya 
 Bolshaya Karmakulskaya, Novaya Zemlya
 Bolshaya Volokovaya, Kola Peninsula
 Borzov Bay, Novaya Zemlya 
 Brandt Bay, Novaya Zemlya
 Chekin Bay, Novaya Zemlya
 Dolgaya Shchel, Kola Peninsula
 Goltsovoye Lake, Novaya Zemlya (a lake with a fjord structure)
 Gribovaya Bay (Gribovii Fjord), Novaya Zemlya
 Inostrantsev Bay, Novaya Zemlya
 Khutuda Fjord, Taymyr Peninsula
 Kislaya Guba, Kola Peninsula
 Kola Bay (Murmansk Fjord), Kola Peninsula
 Klokov Fjord, Novaya Zemlya
 Krestovaya Bay, Novaya Zemlya 
 Krivoshein Bay, Novaya Zemlya
 Lednikovoye Lake, Novaya Zemlya (a lake with a fjord structure)
 Litke Fjord, Novaya Zemlya
 Maka Bay, Novaya Zemlya
 Malaya Volokovaya, Kola Peninsula
 Marat Fjord, October Revolution Island, Severnaya Zemlya
 Mashigin Fjord, Novaya Zemlya
 Matochkin Shar, Novaya Zemlya  (a strait with a fjord structure)
Meta Bay, a northern branch of Matochkin Shar
 Matusevich Fjord, October Revolution Island, Severnaya Zemlya
 Medvezhy Bay, Novaya Zemlya
 Mityushikha Bay (Mytyushev Bay), Novaya Zemlya 
 Neznayemy Bay, Novaya Zemlya
 Nordenskiöld Bay, Novaya Zemlya 
 Northern Sulmenev Bay, Novaya Zemlya 
 Oga Bay, Novaya Zemlya 
 Partizan Fjord, Bolshevik Island, Severnaya Zemlya
 Pechenga Bay, Kola Peninsula
 Penkigney Bay, Chukchi Peninsula
 Polisadov Bay, Novaya Zemlya 
 Providence Bay, Chukchi Peninsula
 Pukhov Fjord, Novaya Zemlya
 Russkaya Bay, Kamchatka
 Russkaya Gavan' Fjord, Novaya Zemlya
 Serebryanka fjord, Novaya Zemlya
 Sedov Bay, Novaya Zemlya
 Shubert Bay, Novaya Zemlya 
 Southern Sulmenev Bay, Novaya Zemlya 
 Spartak Fjord, Bolshevik Island, Severnaya Zemlya
 Stepovoy Fjord, Novaya Zemlya
 Tarya Bay, Kamchatka
 Tereza Klavenes Fjord, Taymyr Peninsula
 Thaelmann Fjord, Bolshevik Island, Severnaya Zemlya
 Tsivolko Bay (Ziwolka Fjord), Novaya Zemlya
 Tumannaya Bay, Bolshevik Island, Severnaya Zemlya
 Ura Bay, Kola Peninsula
 Vera Bay, Novaya Zemlya
 Vilkitsky Bay, Novaya Zemlya
 Vilyuchin Bay, Kamchatka
 Voryema Bay, Kola Peninsula
 Zapadnaya Litsa, Kola Peninsula

See also
List of glaciers in Russia

References

External links

Novaya Zemlya: The Extreme of Europe

 
Lists of landforms of Russia
Russia